Humanist Manifesto II, written in 1973 by humanists Paul Kurtz and Edwin H. Wilson, was an update to the previous Humanist Manifesto published in 1933, and the second entry in the Humanist Manifesto series.  It begins with a statement that the excesses of National Socialism and world war had made the first Manifesto seem too optimistic, and indicated a more hardheaded and realistic approach in its seventeen-point statement, which was much longer and more elaborate than the previous version.  Nevertheless, much of the optimism of the first remained, expressing hope that war and poverty would be eliminated.

In addition to its absolute rejection of theism, deism and belief in credible proof of any afterlife, various political stances are supported, such as opposition to racism, weapons of mass destruction, support of human rights, a proposition of an international court, and the right to unrestricted contraception, abortion and divorce and death with dignity, ex. euthanasia and suicide.

Initially published with a small number of signatures, the document was circulated and gained thousands more, and indeed the American Humanist Association's website encourages visitors to add their own name.  A provision at the end stating that the signators do "not necessarily endorse every detail" of the document, but only its broad vision, no doubt helped many overcome reservations about attaching their name.

One of the oft-quoted lines that comes from this manifesto is, "No deity will save us; we must save ourselves."

The Humanist Manifesto II first appeared in The Humanist September / October, 1973, when Paul Kurtz and Edwin H. Wilson were editor and editor emeritus, respectively.

Signatories 

The 120 original signatories to the manifesto included the following:

United Kingdom

United States

Yugoslavia 
 Svetozar Stojanovic

Soviet Union
 Andrei Sakharov

France 
 Jean-Francois Revel

References

External links 
 Humanist Manifesto II

Humanism

Humanist manifestos
Nontheism publications
1973 essays
1973 documents